The phrase SEC basketball tournament may refer to:

SEC men's basketball tournament
SEC women's basketball tournament